KDE Partition Manager is a disk partitioning application originally written by Volker Lanz for the KDE Platform. It was first released for KDE SC 4.1 and is released independently of the central KDE release cycle. After the death of Volker Lanz in April 2014, Andrius Štikonas continued the development and took over as the maintainer.

It is used for creating, deleting, resizing, moving, checking and copying partitions, and the file systems on them. This is useful for creating space for new operating systems, reorganizing disk usage, copying data residing on hard disks and mirroring one partition with another (disk imaging). Additionally, KDE Partition Manager can back up file systems to files and restore such backups.

It uses util-linux to detect and manipulate devices and partition tables while several (optional) file system tools provide support for manipulating file systems. These optional packages will be detected at runtime and do not require a rebuild of KDE Partition Manager.

As is the case with most KDE applications, KDE Partition Manager is written in the C++ programming language and uses the Qt GUI toolkit. Released under the GNU General Public License, KDE Partition Manager is free software.

Release history

See also 

 Disk partitioning
 List of disk partitioning software

Notes

References

External links 
 
 News about KDE Partition Manager on the blog of Andrius Štikonas
 The KDE Partition Manager Handbook
 The source code of KDE Partition Manager
 KDE Partition Manager release source code downloads
 KDE Partition Manager on linux-apps.org

Extragear
Free partitioning software
KDE Applications